Lake Marsh is a natural lake in South Dakota, in the United States.

Lake Marsh has all of the qualities of a marsh, hence the name.

See also
List of lakes in South Dakota

References

Lakes of South Dakota
Lakes of Hamlin County, South Dakota